Hoyt is an unincorporated community located in the town of Knight, Iron County, Wisconsin, United States. The community was named for a banker from New York, Colgate Hoyt, who was a trustee of the Wisconsin Central railroad in the 1880s.

References

Unincorporated communities in Iron County, Wisconsin
Unincorporated communities in Wisconsin